Muskeg Gap is a low isthmus at the north end of Sobral Peninsula on Nordenskjöld Coast in Graham Land, Antarctica. The gap provides a coastal route between Larsen Inlet and Mundraga Bay, which avoids a long detour around Sobral Peninsula.  Mapped from surveys by Falkland Islands Dependencies Survey (FIDS) (1960–61). Named by United Kingdom Antarctic Place-Names Committee (UK-APC) after the Canadian "Muskeg" tractor.

Isthmuses of Antarctica
Landforms of Graham Land
Nordenskjöld Coast